Acrocercops strophiaula is a moth of the family Gracillariidae. It is known from Indonesia (Java).

The larvae feed on Schima noronhae. They probably mine the leaves of their host plant.

References

strophiaula
Moths of Asia
Moths described in 1935